Wu Qing may refer to:
Wu Qing (athlete) (born 1988), Chinese Paralympian athlete
Wu Qing (footballer) (born 1981), Chinese football player
Wu Qing (politician)